Taihe is a town under the administration of Heishan County, Liaoning, China. , it has 17 villages under its administration:
Taihe Village
Gengtun Village
Baotun Village
Liu'erjin Village
Xiqiu Village
Daxie Village
Xigong'ao Village
Dayugou Village
Xiaoyushu Village
Shengli Village
Baitaizi Village
Wujian Village
Lanni Village
Ziqiang Village
Luojia Village
Shaohu Village
Jianshanzi Village

References 

Township-level divisions of Liaoning
Heishan County